Browns Butte is a bare rock butte at the north side of the mouth of Koski Glacier in the Dominion Range. It was named (without apostrophe) by the Advisory Committee on Antarctic Names for Craig W. Brown, United States Antarctic Research Program meteorologist at South Pole Station, 1963.

References
 

Buttes of Antarctica
Landforms of the Ross Dependency
Shackleton Coast